Jolie Kerr (born 1977) is an American writer and podcast host. Her book, My Boyfriend Barfed in My Handbag...and Other Things You Can't Ask Martha, was a New York Times best-seller.

Career

Ask A Clean Person
Kerr began her writing career in 2011 with a cleaning advice column on The Hairpin called "Ask a Clean Person." Her writing has since appeared on Jezebel, Deadspin, New York Magazine's Racked vertical and Esquire Magazine. Flavorwire described her as a "friendly, down-to-earth, judgement-free advice-giver."

My Boyfriend Barfed in My Handbag
In 2014, Kerr's book was published by Plume Books, a Penguin imprint. Writing for The New York Times, Dwight Garner called My Boyfriend Barfed "the Lorrie Moore short story, or the Tina Fey memoir, of cleaning tutorials...[a] wise and funny new book." At NPR Linda Holmes praised Kerr as "at her most irresistible when she's handling the kinds of awkward questions that do traditionally go unanswered in your women's magazines and your perky home-maintenance shows." The Huffington Post told readers: "This is going to sound like an oxymoron, but there is a genuinely amusing cleaning book out there. Really. I’m not kidding you."

Podcast
Kerr now hosts a podcast for Heritage Radio Network, also called Ask A Clean Person.

References

Living people
21st-century American non-fiction writers
Place of birth missing (living people)
American advice columnists
American women columnists
1977 births
21st-century American women writers